Pterostylis mitchellii, commonly known as Mitchell's rustyhood, is a plant in the orchid family Orchidaceae and is endemic to eastern Australia. Both flowering and non-flowering plants have a rosette of leaves and flowering plants have up to fifteen flowers which have wide flanges on the petals and an insect-like labellum with a white "head".

Description
Pterostylis mitchellii is a terrestrial,  perennial, deciduous, herb with an underground tuber and a rosette of between five and eight leaves. Flowering plants have a rosette at the base of the flowering stem but the leaves are usually withered by flowering time. The dorsal sepal and petals form a hood or "galea" over the column with the petals having wide flanges on their outer edge. The "head" end is white with short bristles and the "body" has five to eight long hairs on each side. Flowering occurs from August to October.

Taxonomy and naming
Pterostylis mitchellii was first formally described in 1848 by John Lindley from a specimen collected on Mount Kennedy in southern Queensland during Thomas Mitchell's 1845-1846 expedition. The description was published in Mitchell's book, Journal of an Expedition into the Interior of Tropical Australia.

Distribution and habitat
Mitchell's rustyhood is widespread and locally common in dry woodland and forest between the Blackdown Tableland in Queensland and Narrabri in New South Wales.

References

mitchellii
Endemic orchids of Australia
Orchids of New South Wales
Orchids of Queensland
Plants described in 1848